Jin-soo is a Korean unisex given name. Its meaning differs based on the hanja used to write each syllable of the name. There are 48 hanja with the reading "jin" and 67 hanja with the reading "soo" on the South Korean government's official list of hanja which may be registered for use in given names.

People with this name include:
Jin Soo Kim (born 1950), South Korean-born American female multimedia artist
Cho Jin-soo (born 1983), South Korean male football forward
Park Jin-soo (born 1987), South Korean male football midfielder
Choi Jin-soo (born 1989), South Korean male basketball player
Choi Jin-soo (footballer) (born 1990), South Korean male football midfielder
Kim Jin-su (born 1992), South Korean male football left back
Byun Jin-soo (born 1993), South Korean male baseball pitcher

Fictional characters with this name include:
Lee Jin-su, male character in 2002 South Korean film Over the Rainbow
Jin-Soo Kwon, male character in 2004–2010 American television series Lost
Jin-su, female character in 2007 South Korean film Le Grand Chef
Kim Jin-soo, female character in 2008 South Korean television series Gourmet
Lee Jin-soo, male character in 2010 South Korean television series Coffee House
Jung Jin-soo, male character in 2013 South Korean film The Berlin File

See also
List of Korean given names

References

Korean unisex given names